Sport Climbing Australia is the governing body for the sport of lead climbing, speed climbing, and bouldering in Australia.

History
The body was founded in 2004 as an amalgamation of the Australian Sport Climbing Federation and the Australian Climbing Gyms Association.  Both bodies had previously designated themselves as the National Sport Organisation for sport climbing in Australia, without any official recognition.  As the Australian Sports Commission requires sports to have a single governing body to be officially recognised, the two bodies put their differences aside in the greater interests of the sport.

Structure
The national body has currently four state member associations: Sport Climbing Victoria, Sport Climbing Queensland, Sport Climbing Tasmania and Sport Climbing NSW/ACT. 
Competition Sport Climbing South Australia and Sport Climbing Western Australia are pending membership.

See also

Rock climbing in Australia
Women's rock climbing in Australia

References

External links
 
 

1963 establishments in Australia
Sports organizations established in 1963
Sports governing bodies in Australia
Climbing organizations
Climbing in Australia
Sport climbing